North Dakota Highway 5 (ND 5) is a  east–west state highway in North Dakota. Its route is in the extreme north part of the state, near the Canada–United States border. The eastern terminus is located about four miles (6 km) east of Joliette at the Red River where the highway continues east as Minnesota State Highway 175. The highway is mostly a two-lane road.

Sites of interest
 Turtle Mountain Chippewa Heritage Center in Belcourt
 Icelandic State Park near Cavalier
 Gunlogson Homestead and Nature Preserve in Cavalier
 Pioneer Heritage Center in Cavalier

Major intersections

References

External links

The North Dakota Highways Page by Chris Geelhart

005